The  ounce is any of several different units of mass, weight or volume and is derived almost unchanged from the , an Ancient Roman unit of measurement.

The avoirdupois ounce (exactly ) is  avoirdupois pound; this is the United States customary and British imperial ounce. It is primarily used in the United States to measure packaged foods and food portions, postal items, areal density of fabric and paper, boxing gloves, and so on, but it is sometimes also used elsewhere in the Anglosphere.

Although the avoirdupois ounce is the mass measure used for most purposes, the 'troy ounce' of exactly  is used instead for the mass of precious metals such as gold, silver, platinum, palladium, rhodium, etc.

The term 'ounce' is also used in other contexts:
 The ounce-force is a measure of force (see below).
 The fluid ounce is a measure of volume.

Historically, a variety of different ounces measuring mass or volume were used in different jurisdictions by different trades and at different times in history.

Etymology 
Ounce derives from the Ancient Roman , a unit in the Ancient Roman units of measurement weighing about 27.35 grams or 0.967 of an Avoirdupois ounce, that was one-twelfth of the Roman pound. This in turn comes from Latin  ('one'), and thus originally meant simply 'unit'. The abbreviation oz came later from the Italian cognate , pronounced  (now , pronounced ).

Definitions 
Historically, in different parts of the world, at different points in time, and for different applications, the ounce (or its translation) has referred to broadly similar but still slightly different standards of mass.

Currently in use

International avoirdupois ounce 
The international avoirdupois ounce (abbreviated oz) is defined as exactly 28.349523125 g under the international yard and pound agreement of 1959, signed by the United States and countries of the Commonwealth of Nations.

In the avoirdupois system, sixteen ounces make up an avoirdupois pound, and the avoirdupois pound is defined as 7000 grains; one avoirdupois ounce is therefore equal to 437.5 grains.

The ounce is still a standard unit in the United States. In the United Kingdom it ceased to be an independent unit of measure in 2000, but may still be seen as an (imprecise) indicator of portion sizes in burger and steak restaurants.

International troy ounce 

A troy ounce (abbreviated oz t) is equal to 480 grains.  Consequently, the international troy ounce is equal to exactly 31.1034768 grams.  There are 12 troy ounces in the now obsolete troy pound.

Today, the troy ounce is used only to express the mass of precious metals such as gold, platinum, palladium, rhodium or silver. Bullion coins are the most common products produced and marketed in troy ounces, but precious metal bars also exist in gram and kilogram (kg) sizes. (A kilogram bullion bar contains .)

For historical measurement of gold,
 a fine ounce is a troy ounce of pure gold content in a gold bar, computed as fineness multiplied by gross weight
 a standard ounce is a troy ounce of 22 carat gold, 91.66% pure (an 11 to 1 proportion of gold to alloy material)

Metric ounces 
Some countries have redefined their ounces in the metric system.  For example, the German apothecaries' ounce of 30 grams, is very close to the previously widespread Nuremberg ounce, but the divisions and multiples come out in metric.

In 1820, the Dutch redefined their ounce (in Dutch, ons) as 100 grams.  In 1937 the IJkwet of the Netherlands officially abolished the term, but it is still commonly used. 
Dutch amendments to the metric system, such as an ons or 100 grams, has been inherited, adopted, and taught in Indonesia beginning in elementary school. It is also listed as standard usage in Indonesia's national dictionary, the Kamus Besar Bahasa Indonesia, and the government's official elementary-school curriculum.

Historical

Apothecaries' ounce 
The apothecaries' ounce (abbreviated ℥) equivalent to the troy ounce, was formerly used by apothecaries, and is thus obsolete.

Maria Theresa ounce 
"Maria Theresa ounce" was once introduced in Ethiopia and some European countries, which was equal to the weight of one Maria Theresa thaler, or 28.0668 g. Both the weight and the value are the definition of one birr, still in use in present-day Ethiopia and formerly in Eritrea.

Spanish ounce 

The Spanish pound (Spanish libra) was 460 g.

Tower ounce  
It dates back to the Anglo-Saxon coinage weight standard. It was abolished in favour of the Troy ounce by Henry VIII in 1527.

Ounce-force

It is defined as the force exerted by a mass of one avoirdupous ounce under standard gravity (at the surface of the earth, its weight).

The "ounce" in "ounce-force" is equivalent to an avoirdupois ounce; ounce-force is a measurement of force using avoirdupois ounces.  It is customarily not identified or differentiated.  The term has limited use in engineering calculations to simplify unit conversions between mass, force, and acceleration systems of calculations.

Fluid ounce

A fluid ounce (abbreviated fl oz, fl. oz. or oz. fl.) is one of three units of volume. An imperial fluid ounce is defined as 28.4130625 mL, a US customary fluid ounce is 29.57353 mL, and a US food labelling fluid ounce is 30 mL. The fluid ounce is sometimes referred to simply as an "ounce" in applications where its use is implicit, such as bartending.

Other uses

Fabric weight 
Ounces are also used to express the "weight", or more accurately the areal density, of a textile fabric in North America, Asia, or the UK, as in "16 oz denim". The number refers to the weight in ounces of a given amount of fabric, either a yard of a given width, or a square yard, where the depth of the fabric is a fabric-specific constant.

Copper layer thickness of a printed circuit board 
The most common unit of measure for the copper thickness on a printed circuit board (PCB) is ounces (oz), as in mass. It is the resulting thickness when the mass of copper is pressed flat and spread evenly over a one-square-foot area. 1 oz will roughly equal 34.7 µm.

Notes and references

External links 
 Dictionary of Units: Ounce

Customary units of measurement in the United States
Imperial units
Units of mass